Shangtang station is a station on Line 4 of the Shenzhen Metro. It opened on 16 June 2011. Space was reserved for extra platforms and tracks for cross-platform interchange with Line 6, however in 2012, the Line 6 route north of Shenzhen North Station was realigned one block east, dropping the plan to use these provisions.

Station layout

Exits

References

External links
 Shenzhen Metro Shangtang Station (Chinese)
 Shenzhen Metro Shangtang Station (English)

Railway stations in Guangdong
Shenzhen Metro stations
Longhua District, Shenzhen
Railway stations in China opened in 2011